Vietnam competed at the 2010 Summer Youth Olympics, the inaugural Youth Olympic Games, held in Singapore from 14 August to 26 August 2010.

The Vietnamese team comprised 13 athletes competing in 7 sports: aquatics (swimming), athletics, shooting, badminton, taekwondo, wrestling, weightlifting.

Medalists

Athletics

Girls
Field Events

Badminton

Boys

Girls

Shooting

Pistol

Swimming

Taekwondo

Weightlifting

Wrestling

Freestyle

References

External links
Competitors List: Vietnam

Nations at the 2010 Summer Youth Olympics
2010 in Vietnamese sport
Vietnam at the Youth Olympics